The year 1858 in archaeology

Explorations
 February 2 - Systematic exploration of the prehistoric Swiss lake pile village of Wetzikon-Robenhausen by Jakob Messikommer begins.
 Désiré Charnay makes the first photographs of the Maya ruins of Palenque

Excavations

Finds
 Stone tools in a cave at Brixham in England.
 Hoard of Neolithic flint tools and weapons at York in England.
 Ancient Greek sculpture of the Lion of Knidos found by Richard Popplewell Pullan near modern-day Datça, Turkey.
 Stele of Ankh-ef-en-Khonsu at Dayr al-Bahri by François Auguste Ferdinand Mariette.
 Boston Green Head at the Serapeum of Saqqara (presumed year).
 December 31 - Roman coin hoard at Weston Underwood found in Buckinghamshire, England.

Publications

Births
 Approximate date - Mary Brodrick, English Egyptologist (died 1933)

Deaths
 February 6 - Georg Friedrich Creuzer, German Greek philologist and archaeologist (born 1771)

Establishments
Municipal museum of Saverne, France, established.

See also 
 List of years in archaeology
 1857 in archaeology
 1859 in archaeology

References

Archaeology by year
Archaeology
Archaeology
Archaeology